The Wind Wand is a 48-metre kinetic sculpture located in New Plymouth, New Zealand. The sculpture includes a 45-metre tube of red fibreglass, and was made to designs by artist Len Lye. To residents, it is one of the main icons of New Plymouth. During the night, the Wind Wand lights up.

Costing over $300,000 it was originally installed in December 1999 along with the Coastal Walkway, it had to be taken down within weeks. After repairs it was reinstalled in June 2001. The red fibreglass tube stands vertical in still air, but bends in the wind.

On 17 September 2017, the Wind Wand was struck by lightning.

Materials 
The Wind Wand is constructed out of fibreglass and carbon fibre. It weighs around 900 kg and has a diameter of 200 mm. The Wind Wand can bend at least 20 m. The red sphere on the top contains 1,296 light-emitting diodes.

See also
Zephyrometer

References

External links
Official website (archived)

Buildings and structures in New Plymouth
Fiberglass sculptures
1999 sculptures
Kinetic sculptures
Outdoor sculptures in New Zealand